Tayyab is an Arabic male given name and surname meaning "good-natured". Related names include Tayyib, Tayeb or Tayyip. Notable people with the name Tayyab include:

 Tayyab Abbas (born 1994), Pakistani cricketer
 Tayyab Mahmood Sheikh (born 2003), Young Pakistani Business Entrepreneur
 Tayyab Agha (born 1976), Afghan politician
 Tayyab Aslam (born 1996), Pakistani squash player
 Tayyab Riaz (born 1992), Pakistani cricketer

See also
El Taib
Taybeh (disambiguation)
Lashkar-e-Taiba, Islamist militant group in Kashmir

Masculine given names